Rabiranjan Maitra is an Indian film director and editor who predominantly works in Bengali cinema. His most notable works include Tobu Mone Rekho (1994), Mr. and Mrs. Iyer (2002), Raatporir Rupkatha (2007), Rok Sako To Rok Lo (2007), Challenge (2009), Chalo Paltai (2011), Chander Pahar (film) (2013), Meghe Dhaka Tara (2013), Jole Jongole (2016), and Amazon Obhijaan (2017). His 2018 ventures include action thriller Kabir starring Rukmini Maitra and Shankar Mudi featuring Kaushik Ganguly, Anjan Dutt, and Sreela Majumder.

Career
Maitra is noted for his work in Bengali cinema. He started his career with the TV movie Tero Sandhyar Galpo in 1990. After that, he got into the world of television. In his career, he has worked in more than 315 feature films. He has worked as a director, an actor, an editor, a sound designer and a producer in many films.

Filmography

Editor

External links

References

Male actors from West Bengal
People from Howrah
Male actors in Bengali cinema
21st-century Indian male actors
1962 births
Living people